Standings and results for Group 6 of the UEFA Euro 1984 qualifying tournament.

Group 6 consisted of Albania, Austria, Northern Ireland, Turkey and defending champions West Germany. Group winners were West Germany, who won the group ahead of Northern Ireland on goal difference.

Final table

Results

Goalscorers

References
UEFA Page
RSSSF

Group 6
1982–83 in Northern Ireland association football
1983–84 in Northern Ireland association football
1982–83 in German football
Qual
1982–83 in Albanian football
1983–84 in Albanian football
1982–83 in Austrian football
1983–84 in Austrian football
1982–83 in Turkish football
1983–84 in Turkish football